Captain Robert Cecil Beavan (1841 – 3 February 1870), corresponding member of the Zoological Society of London, served in India with the Bengal Staff Corps for 10 years. During his short life he collected specimens of birds and eggs at various locations. He contributed notes to the Ibis journal as wells as the Proceedings of the Zoological Society of London. He also collaborated with Allan Octavian Hume. His collection of eggs and birds went into the Natural History Museum through the Tweeddale and Godman-Salvin collections.

In 1864 Beavan worked at Barrackpore and the winter of that year was spent in the Maunbhoom District, an area studied earlier by Samuel Tickell and Edward Blyth. His notes on this period were published in The Ibis (1865) entitled "Notes on various Indian Birds". While still in service he collected in the Andaman Islands and with additional information from Colonel Robert Christopher Tytler, wrote  "The Avifauna of the Andaman Islands" in the Ibis in 1867.

Beavan was sent home once to Britain due to bad health, and on his second such trip, he died at sea.

The species Pyrrhula erythaca, first collected by him, is sometimes called Beavan's Bullfinch (Also called Gray-headed Bullfinch).

His brother, Reginald, a lieutenant in the 22nd Punjab Native Infantry (Bengal Staff Corps where he was Lieutenant 1 Jan 1862, Captain 4 May 1872, Major 4 May 1880), was a keen sports hunter and took an interest in fishes.

Publications
Beavan's chief publications are a series of notes in the Ibis between 1865 and 1868. These included many notes of Colonel R C Tytler.

 Ibis, 1865, pp. 400–423
 XVIII. The Avifauna of the Andaman Islands. Ibis 9(3):314–334
 XXVI. Notes on various Indian Birds. Ibis 9(4):430–455 (1867)
 VIII. Notes on Various Indian Birds. Ibis 10(1):73–85 (1868)
 XIII. Notes on Various Indian Birds. Ibis 10(2):165–181
 XXXI. Notes on Various Indian Birds. Ibis 10(4):370–406 (Address South Penge Park 18 July 1868)
 XXXVII. Additional Notes on various Indian Birds. Ibis 11(4):403–426
 (Accipitres) P. Z. S. 1868, pp. 390–402.

Reginald appears to have communicated some of Robert's papers to the Proceedings of the Zoological society after his death. The Handbook of the freshwater fishes of India, was published posthumously in 1877 and is attributed to "Capt. R. Beavan, Bengal Staff Corps CMZS".

 Descriptions of two imperfectly known Species of Cyprinoid Fishes from the Punjab, India. By Lieut. Reginald Beavan, F.R.G.S., Revenue Survey Department of India. PSZL, pages 150–153, 1872. 
 A communication was read from Capt. R. Beavan, Bengal Staff Corps, C.M.Z.S., containing a list of fishes met with in the river Nerbudda, Minar district of India. PZSL, p. 685, 1873

Footnotes

Citations

References
 Obituary. Ibis 1870:301–302
 Warr, F. E. 1996. Manuscripts and Drawings in the ornithology and Rothschild libraries of The Natural History Museum at Tring. BOC.
 Mearns, B,& R. Mearns. 2002. The Bird Collectors. A & C Black. pp. 196–7

External links
 Handbook of The Freshwater Fishes of India (scanned book) by Capt. R. Beavan (Bengal Staff Corps)

1841 births
1870 deaths
Bengal Staff Corps officers
British naturalists
British ornithologists
People who died at sea